Astragalus ehrenbergii (also called Tragacantha ehrenbergii or in Hebrew "קדד אהרנברג") is a terrestrial, perennial plant with alternating, smooth pinnate leaves and yellow flowers. Ehrenbergii blooms in June, and can be found in Israel.

References

ehrenbergii
Perennial plants
Flora of Lebanon
Taxa named by Alexander von Bunge